Agios Nikolaos is a district of the Municipality of Kato Polemidia.

Location 
To the east and north it borders with Panagia Evangelistria, to the west with Ypsonas and to the south with Anthoupolis.

Religious sites 
The sanctuary church of the district is dedicated to Agios Nikolaos.

References

Quarters of Kato Polemidia